Penstemon hirsutus is a species of flowering plant in the plantain family known by the common name hairy beard-tongue. It is native to the eastern Canada and the United States.

This perennial species has hairy stems up to 90 centimetres tall, hence its species name, hirsutus. The leaves are opposite, stalkless, and lancelate.

This species of Penstemon is found in dry alvars, prairies, savannas, and old fields.

References

hirsutus
Flora of Eastern Canada
Flora of the Northeastern United States
Flora of the Appalachian Mountains
Flora of the Southeastern United States